Rajendra is a genus of moths in the family Erebidae from India.

Species 
 Rajendra biguttata (Walker, 1855)
 Rajendra biguttata irregularis Moore, 1882
 Rajendra cingulata (Rothschild, 1910)
 Rajendra perrottetii (Guérin-Méneville, [1844])

References

 , 2007: Review of the genus Rajendra Moore, with systematic notes on the genus Nannoarctia Kôda (Lepidoptera, Arctiidae). Tinea 20 (1): 67-76, Tokyo.

External links
Natural History Museum Lepidoptera generic names catalog

Spilosomina
Moth genera